John Gillies Mark Grahame (born August 31, 1975) is an American former professional ice hockey goaltender who played in the National Hockey League with the Boston Bruins, Tampa Bay Lightning and Carolina Hurricanes.  He won the Stanley Cup with the Tampa Bay Lightning in 2004.

Playing career
Grahame played in the USHL for the Sioux City Musketeers before he was drafted in the ninth round, 229th overall by the Boston Bruins in the 1994 NHL Entry Draft. He then elected to play three years of collegiate hockey with the Lake Superior State Lakers of the CCHA, and would later become the only Lakers goaltender to play more than 50 games in the NHL or win the Stanley Cup.

John turned professional in the 1997–98 season, and was assigned by the Bruins to start for the Providence Bruins. In his second pro year, Grahame returned to the P-Bruins and took the team to the playoffs, leading them to victory in the Calder Cup.

In the 1999–2000 campaign, Grahame started the season back in Providence, but was called up to the Boston Bruins mid-season to back up Byron Dafoe in the Bruins' net, where he played credibly and was second in balloting to the league's all-rookie team.  However, a broken ankle in the 2000 offseason took a long time to heal, and Grahame struggled to recapture his form. He played for the next three seasons in Boston before being traded midseason in 2003 to the Tampa Bay Lightning. The following season, Grahame returned to standard, having the best season of his career as a backup for the Stanley Cup-winning club. Grahame's presence allowed starter Nikolai Khabibulin to get extended rest when he needed.

He became Tampa Bay's starting goalie in the 2005–06 NHL season, but was criticized publicly by head coach John Tortorella after consecutive poor starts which contributed to the Lightning being eliminated in the first round of the Playoffs.

Grahame signed a two-year, $2.8 million contract with the Carolina Hurricanes on July 1, 2006. He was placed on waivers by the Hurricanes on January 4, 2008. The Hurricanes called up Michael Leighton from the team's AHL affiliate, the Albany River Rats, to replace him as the team's backup goaltender after Grahame began the season with a 4–6–1 record. The Hurricanes recalled Grahame on January 21.

During this time, Grahame played a single game for the United States Olympic team in the 2006 Winter Olympics, and also was the starter for the United States National Team in the 2007 World Championships.

In May 2008, after the conclusion of the Hurricanes' season, as a free agent, Grahame signed with Avangard Omsk of the new Kontinental Hockey League.

On December 12, 2009, Grahame signed a professional tryout contract for the 2009–10 season with the  Philadelphia Flyers AHL affiliate, the Adirondack Phantoms. After playing in 12 games with the Phantoms, Grahame signed a contract with the Colorado Avalanche and was assigned to the injury-hit Lake Erie Monsters on March 3, 2010. He played in 14 games, recording only 4 wins, with the Monsters to finish the season and was re-signed on a one-year contract by the Avalanche on July 2, 2010.

He was brought up to the Avalanche on February 11, 2011, after Craig Anderson went back to Denver for personal reasons. He sat on the bench serving as Peter Budaj's backup for two contests and did not see any playing time. At the end of the 2010–11 season, he retired after the Monsters made it to the playoffs for the first time in their 4-year history.

On March 28, 2012, he briefly came out of retirement and signed a contract with the New York Islanders to serve as a backup for the injury depleted team through the remainder of the 2011–12 season. At the completion of the season he did not manage to feature in a game for the Islanders.

Coaching career
On September 15, 2011, it was announced the Grahame would become the goaltending coach for the Sioux City Musketeers of the USHL, a team that he had previously played for in his career.

Personal
He is the son of former professional goaltender Ron Grahame, who served as assistant athletic director at the University of Denver. His father was traded for the draft pick used to select John Grahame's future teammate Ray Bourque. His mother, Charlotte was a member of the front office of the Colorado Avalanche that won the Stanley Cup. John & Charlotte are the first mother and son to get their names engraved on the Stanley Cup.

Career statistics

Regular season and playoffs

See also
Notable families in the NHL

Awards and honors

References

External links

 
 The Goaltender profile

1975 births
Living people
Adirondack Phantoms players
Albany River Rats players
American men's ice hockey goaltenders
Avangard Omsk players
Boston Bruins draft picks
Boston Bruins players
Carolina Hurricanes players
American expatriate ice hockey players in Russia
Ice hockey players at the 2006 Winter Olympics
Lake Erie Monsters players
Lake Superior State Lakers men's ice hockey players
Olympic ice hockey players of the United States
Providence Bruins players
Stanley Cup champions
Tampa Bay Lightning players
Ice hockey people from Denver
Sioux City Musketeers players